The Royal Households of the United Kingdom are the collective departments that support members of the British royal family. Many members of the royal family who undertake public duties have separate households. They vary considerably in size, from the large Royal Household that supports the sovereign to the household of the Prince and Princess of Wales, with fewer members.

In addition to the royal officials and support staff, the sovereign's own household incorporates representatives of other estates of the realm, including the government, the military, and the church. Government whips, defence chiefs, several clerics, scientists, musicians, poets, and artists hold honorary positions within the Royal Household. In this way, the Royal Household may be seen as having a symbolic, as well as a practical, function: exemplifying the monarchy's close relationship with other parts of the constitution and of national life.

History 
The royal household grew out of the earlier "thegnhood". Among the most eminent and powerful of the king's thegns were his "dishthegn", his "bowerthegn", and his horsethegn or staller. In Normandy at the time of the Conquest a similar arrangement, borrowed from the French court, had long been established. Norman dukes, like their overlords the kings of France, had their seneschal or steward, their chamberlain and their constable. After the Norman Conquest, the ducal household of Normandy was reproduced in the royal household of England; and since, in the spirit of feudalism, the great offices of the first and second were made hereditary. Thenceforth they were held by the grantees and their descendants as a holder of tenure in grand serjeanty of the Crown.

The Chapel—led by the lord chancellor—served the king's spiritual and secretarial needs. Subordinate to the chancellor was the master of the writing office (or chancery) who supervised the clerks who wrote various government documents. The Chamber was the main financial office within the king's government and also saw to the king's personal needs. The Chamber was led by the master chamberlain (Latin , later called the Lord Great Chamberlain), lesser chamberlains, and other officials. The next department was the Hall, led by the stewards who probably were four in number and served in rotation. The buttery was led by the butler. The constabulary-marshalsea constituted the outdoor staff (including a large number of hunting officials) under the authority of the constables and master-marshal. These officers also supervised the knights of the royal household, who formed the backbone of the king's army. Others were younger sons forced to make their own way in the world. 

Over time, the offices of Lord High Steward and Lord Great Chamberlain lost both their political functions, which were taken over by the Chief Justiciar and Lord High Treasurer, and their domestic functions, which were taken over by the lord steward and lord chamberlain. The marshal of England took the place of the constable of England in the royal palace and was associated with him in the command of the royal armies. The marshalship and the constableship became hereditary, and, although the Lord High Constable and Earl Marshal retained their military authority until a comparatively late period, their original duties were transferred to the master of the horse. In these circumstances the holders of the original great offices of state and the household ceased to attend court except on occasions of extraordinary ceremony, and their representatives either by inheritance or by special appointment continued to appear at coronations and some other public solemnities, such as the State Opening of Parliament or trials by the House of Lords.

The  was led by the lord steward, who was in charge of the household's finances and led the counting house (the Board of Green Cloth). Financial officers serving under the lord steward were:

 Treasurer of the Household
 Comptroller of the Household
 Cofferer of the Household
 two Clerks of the Green Cloth

The lord steward's department also included the service areas (kitchens, bakehouse, buttery, laundry, woodyard, etc.) and the great hall where most of the household officers ate. The  was led by the lord chamberlain. His department was responsible for the royal apartments and the people who served there:

 body servants
 waiting staff
 royal physicians
 chaplains
 gentleman ushers
 yeoman ushers
 grooms
 pages

In the 15th century, the Chamber divided into two sub-departments: the great chamber and the privy chamber. The privy chamber was overseen by grooms of the chamber, led by the groom of the stool. The groom of the stool was one of the most powerful officials in the household until the office was abolished in 1837. He or she (when the monarch was female) acted as a royal gatekeeper, allowing or denying other household officials access to the monarch.

In its main outlines the existing organisation of the royal household is essentially the same as it was under the Tudors or the Plantagenets. It is divided into three principal departments, at the head of which are the lord steward, the lord chamberlain and the master of the horse, and the respective provinces of which may be generally described as "below stairs", "above stairs" and "out of doors". The duties of these officials, and the various officers under their charge are dealt with in the articles under those headings. When the reigning sovereign is a queen, the royal household is in some other respects rather differently arranged from that of a king and a queen consort.

Under a king and a queen consort, a separate establishment "above stairs" and "out of doors" works for the queen consort. She has a Lord Chamberlain's department of her own, and all the ladies of the court from the Mistress of the Robes to the Maids of Honour are in her service. At the commencement of the reign of Queen Victoria, the two establishments were combined, and considerably reduced. On the accession of Edward VII, the civil list was again reconstituted; while the household of the king and his consort became larger than during the previous reign, redundant or unnecessary offices were merged or abolished.

The household of Elizabeth II included 1,200 employees. This was roughly the same size as Charles II's household but larger than Victoria's, whose staff numbered 921.

The King and Queen Consort

Start of the new reign
Appointing a new monarch's household can take some time; in 1952 the full list of appointments to the new Queen's household was not published until almost six months after her accession to the throne.

In 2022, walking in the state procession for the state funeral of Elizabeth II, the new King was followed by his Private Secretary, Principal Private Secretary, Master of the Household and two Equerries; however, since the King's new household had yet to be appointed they were gazetted, not as 'His Majesty's Household', but as the 'Household of the former Prince of Wales and Duchess of Cornwall'.

On 13 September, five days after the death of his mother, Queen Elizabeth II, 100 staff who had been working for King Charles III while he was Prince of Wales were notified of potential redundancies. This reflects the uncertain situation of members of the Royal Households at the start of each new reign: in the days following the death of King James I in 1625, the Countess of Bedford remarked 'What the King's resolution is yet for his own and his father's servants, he hath not declared (farther than the white staves, which are to remain as they were); but for the green cloth and other inferior officers both of the household and chamber, it is thought that he will employ his own and dismiss his father's, because he hath caused the latter all to be removed to Denmark House to attend the body, and lodged the former about himself at Whitehall'.

As consort of the British sovereign, Queen Camilla will receive a household of her own. Traditionally, queens consort have appointed their own Lord Chamberlain and various ladies-in-waiting as part of their household. This tradition was scrapped in accordance with the King's view of having a slimmed-down monarchy, and instead of ladies-in-waiting, Queen Camilla will be served by "Queen's companions", a group of six ladies that will occupy the new occasional and informal position and will not be involved in tasks such as replying to letters or developing schedules. The Queen's companions are the Marchioness of Lansdowne, Jane von Westenholz,  Lady Brooke, Sarah Troughton, Lady Sarah Keswick and Baroness Chisholm. Major Ollie Plunket will serve as the Queen consort's equerry. Queen Elizabeth II's ladies-in-waiting will be given new roles as "ladies of the household".

Present arrangements
The Household is for the time being configured as follows (according to the arrangements inherited from Elizabeth II):

Great Officers 
The Great Officers of the Household are, in order of seniority, the Lord Steward, the Lord Chamberlain and the Master of the Horse. Only the Lord Chamberlain fulfils an executive function; while the other two continue to have a ceremonial role, and are to be seen particularly on State occasions.

Lord Chamberlain 
As currently arranged, the Royal Household is coordinated by the part-time Lord Chamberlain (Andrew Parker, Lord Parker of Minsmere GCVO KCB), and organised into functionally separate units.

Heads of departments 
The Private Secretary to the Sovereign (Rt Hon. Sir Edward Young  since 2017), manages the Private Secretary's Office, and also controls the Press Office, the Royal Archives, and the Defence Services Secretary's Office, serves as principal advisor to the Sovereign and serves as the principal channel of communication between the Sovereign and his or her governments. Besides these, he also manages the Sovereign's official programme and correspondence.

The Keeper of the Privy Purse has responsibility for the Sovereign's personal finances and those to do with semi-private concerns, along with, as Treasurer to the King oversight of the civil list. The two positions are held together and, since 2018, they have both been held by Sir Michael Stevens .

The Master of the Household, since 2013, has been Vice Admiral Sir Tony Johnstone-Burt  and has overall responsibility for the domestic workings of the Household.

The Lord Chamberlain's Office, led by its Comptroller current Lt-Colonel Michael Vernon, is responsible for official royal occasions.

The Royal Collection Department is overseen by its Director who since February 2018 is Tim Knox.

Other units 
The Royal Almonry, Ecclesiastical Household, and Medical Household are functionally separate. For accounting purposes they are the responsibility of the Keeper of the Privy Purse and Treasurer to the King.

The Crown Equerry has day-to-day operation of the Royal Mews, and is part of the Lord Chamberlain's Office. The other equerries have a different role: attending and assisting the King in his official duties from day to day. (Historically, they too were part of the mews, but today they are entirely separate.)

The Central Chancery of the Orders of Knighthood is also under the Lord Chamberlain's Office, as is the office of the Marshal of the Diplomatic Corps.

The College of Arms has been a branch of the Royal Household since its incorporation in 1484 by King Richard III it was directly appointed by the Sovereign on the recommendation of Earl Marshal. The college is a corporation of thirteen royal heralds, overseen by the Earl Marshal, a hereditary office held by the Duke of Norfolk. The college is self-supporting and receives no funds from the Crown. The college holds jurisdiction over all matters pertaining to heraldry, genealogy, and pedigrees in England, Wales, Northern Ireland and in some Commonwealth realms.

Certain independent and honorific posts include Master of the King's Music, Piper to the Sovereign, Poet Laureate, and Astronomer Royal. The King's Bargemaster, the Keeper of the Jewel House, the Serjeants-at-Arms, and the Warden and Marker of the Swans, perform less celebrated functions.

The offices of Treasurer of the Household, Comptroller of the Household, and Vice-Chamberlain of the Household are held by senior government whips in the House of Commons. In the House of Lords, the Government Chief Whip is usually appointed Captain of the Gentlemen-at-Arms and the Deputy Chief Whip as Captain of the Yeomen of the Guard, with junior whips appointed as lords-in-waiting and baronesses-in-waiting. Occasionally these officers are called upon to undertake Household duties, especially the Vice-Chamberlain, who is responsible for writing regular parliamentary reports for the King.

If the monarch is female she has ladies-in-waiting (formally styled either ladies of the bedchamber or women of the bedchamber), some of whom are in personal attendance on a daily basis. They are overseen by the Mistress of the Robes, who traditionally was head of the female household. If the monarch is male these roles are instead attached to the Household of the Queen consort.

The Household includes a number of honorary military appointments: the aides-de-camp to the King (who are usually very high-ranking officers of the three armed services), the two Gold Sticks and the Vice Admiral and Rear Admiral of the United Kingdom. In addition, the two corps of royal bodyguards (the Gentlemen at Arms and the Yeomen of the Guard) are part of the Household.

Gentlemen ushers are unpaid members of the Royal Household, often retired military officers, who provide occasional assistance as marshals at royal events. The Lady Usher of the Black Rod is an important official in the Houses of Parliament; but technically she too is a member of the Royal Household (and acts as the King's messenger at the State Opening).

The royal residences (see list of British royal residences) in current use are cared for and maintained by the Royal Household Property Section directly from the grant-in-aid provided by Parliament, whereas Balmoral Castle and Sandringham House are privately owned and maintained. The unoccupied royal residences (including the Tower of London) are run by the Historic Royal Palaces Agency, which is self-funding.

The Scottish Royal Household
The Royal Household in Scotland includes offices of personal, honorary and state appointments. Many appointments are vacant having fallen into abeyance; been abolished or returned to The Crown; merged with other positions both before and after the Union of the Crown with England; or due to lack of a clear office holder.

The Great Officers of the Royal Household, (not to be confused with the Great Officers of State of Scotland which are political and judicial appointments, or the Great Officers of the Crown of Scotland though some officers are shared) are:
 Lord High Constable – Merlin Hay, 24th Earl of Erroll
 Master of the Household – Torquhil Campbell, 13th Duke of Argyll
 Keeper of the Palace of Holyroodhouse – Alexander Douglas-Hamilton, 16th Duke of Hamilton
 Armour-Bearer and Squire of His Majesty's Body – traditionally held by the Setons of Touch
 Bearer of the Royal Banner – Alexander Scrymgeour, 12th Earl of Dundee
 Bearer of the National Flag of Scotland – Ian Maitland, 18th Earl of Lauderdale
 Lord Justice General of Scotland – Colin Sutherland, Lord Carloway
 Great Steward of Scotland – William, Duke of Rothesay

Ecclesiastical officers of the Ecclesiastical Household of Scotland:
Lord High Commissioner to the General Assembly of the Church of Scotland – Patrick Hodge, Lord Hodge
 Bishop of the Chapel Royal - (Vacant since the ruination of the Chapel Royal and disestablishment of the (Episcopal) Church of Scotland c.1689)
 Royal Almoner – (Vacant)
Dean of the Chapel Royal – Professor David Fergusson  
Dean of the Thistle, an officer of the Order of the Thistle – Professor David Fergusson 
 2 Chaplains:
The minister at Crathie Kirk
The minister at Canongate Kirk
10 Church of Scotland Honorary Chaplains to the King

The Royal Household includes a number of other hereditary and non-hereditary offices:
Lord High Chamberlain – (Vacant)
Treasurer of Scotland – (Vacant)
Comptroller of Scotland – (Vacant)
Great Marischal of Scotland – (Vacant)
Knight Marischal – (Vacant)
Justiciar of Scotia – (Vacant)
Justiciar of Lothian – (Vacant)
Justiciar of Galloway – (Vacant)
Lord Warden of the Marches – (Vacant)
Chancellor of the Order of the Thistle – David Ogilvy, 13th Earl of Airlie
Gentleman Usher of the Green Rod – Rear Admiral Christopher Hope Layman 
King's and Lord Treasurer's Remembrancer – David Harvie
Governor of Edinburgh Castle – Major General Alastair Andrew Bernard Reibey Bruce of Crionaich 
A number of Hereditary Keepers of Palaces and Castles:
Falkland Palace – Ninian Crichton-Stuart
Stirling Castle – the Earl of Mar and Kellie
Dunstaffnage Castle – the Duke of Argyll
Dunconnel Castle – Sir Charles Edward Maclean of Dunconnel Bt, 2nd Baronet of Strachur and Glensluain, Baron Strachur
Linlithgow Palace – (Vacant)
Carrick Castle – the Duke of Argyll
Dumbarton Castle – Brigadier Donald Hardie
Dunstaffnage Castle – the Duke of Argyll
Tarbert Castle – the Duke of Argyll
Dunfermline Palace – (Vacant)
Castle Sween – the Duke of Argyll 
Blackness Castle – (Vacant)
Keeper and Ranger of the Park of Holyroodhouse - (Vacant - associated with the Earl of Haddington until 1844)
Lord Lyon King of Arms – The Reverend Canon Joseph John Morrow 
The Lord Lyon King of Arms's heralds and pursuivants,
Commissioners for the Safekeeping of the Regalia
Deputy-keeper of the Honours of Scotland
Yeoman-Keepers of the Honours of Scotland
Bailie of the Abbey Court of Holyroodhouse
Gentleman Usher of the White Rod – The Rt Rev. Dr John A. Armes, Bishop of Edinburgh
Postilions, Grooms and Footmen of the Scottish State Coach
Master of the Mint in Scotland – (Vacant)
Master Carver for Scotland – Sir Sebastian Anstruther of Balcluskie
Butler of Scotland – (Vacant)
Pantler of Scotland – (Vacant)
Washer of the Sovereign's Hands in Scotland – Simon Houison Craufurd, 29th Laird of Craufurdland Castle
Hereditary Royal Falconer of Scotland – John Hugh Borthwick, 24th Lord Borthwick
Historiographer Royal – Christopher Smout 
His Majesty's Botanist – Professor Stephen Blackmore 
Master of Work to the Crown of Scotland - (Vacant)
The Painter and Limner – Dame Elizabeth Blackadder 
Sculptor in Ordinary for Scotland – Alexander Stoddart 
Surveyor of the King's Pictures – (Vacant – in abeyance since 2020)
Astronomer Royal for Scotland – Catherine Heymans 
Geographer Royal for Scotland – Professor Charles Withers 
Various other Royal physicians, surgeons, apothecaries, chemists, etc.
The Crown Jeweller
Her Majesty's Clockmaker and Keeper and Dresser of His Majesty's Clocks in Scotland – Hamilton & Inches
Court Postmaster

The Household Division, Sovereign's Body Guard, King's Guard, and ceremonial military posts and bodies
Lieutenant General of the North – (Vacant)
Lord High Admiral of Scotland – (Vacant)
Vice Admiral of Scotland – (Vacant)
Admiral of the Western Coasts and Isles – Torquhil Campbell, 13th Duke of Argyll
Lord High Admiral of the Firth of Forth
Vice-Admiral of Orkney and Shetland – (Vacant – historically associated with the Sheriff Depute of Orkney and Shetland)
Gold Stick and Silver Stick for Scotland
The Royal Company of Archers, the monarch's bodyguard in Scotland
High Constables and Guard of Honour of the Palace of Holyroodhouse
Doorward Guard of Partisans – personal retainers of the Lord High Constable of Scotland and bodyguard to the sovereign
The Scots Guards
The Mounted Troop of the Royal Scots Dragoon Guards – Ceremonial mounted unit based at Edinburgh Castle, assembled for events such as the Waterloo Day celebrations 
Balaklava Company of The Argyll and Sutherland Highlanders, 5th Battalion, Royal Regiment of Scotland – tasked with State and Ceremonial Duties in Scotland such as mounting the Guard at Holyrood Palace
Piper to the Sovereign and senior members of the Royal Family.
Her Majesty's state trumpeters in Scotland

Household of the Prince and Princess of Wales
A part-time Private Secretary to Prince William and Prince Harry (James Lowther-Pinkerton MVO MBE Irish Guards (Rtd.)) was appointed in the Household of the Prince of Wales and the Princess of Wales in May 2005. In January 2009, a separate Household of Prince William and Prince Harry was established (formally "The Household of His Royal Highness Prince William of Wales and His Royal Highness Prince Henry of Wales"), headed by Lowther-Pinkerton. Following their marriages, the Household also additionally served their wives. The Household's offices are currently based in Kensington Palace, having formerly been based in St James's Palace. The Household, as of 2011, had the equivalent of 7.8 full-time staff.

It was announced in June 2011 that the Duke and Duchess of Cambridge would temporarily move their official London residence to an apartment in Kensington Palace, a move that was completed in August of that year. The Duke and Duchess' primary residence continued to be the island of Anglesey in Wales, where the Duke served as an RAF search and rescue pilot. The couple previously shared an apartment at Clarence House with Prince Harry, which he retained. On 6 November 2011, it was announced that the Duke, Duchess and Prince Harry, along with the Queen and the Prince of Wales, had approved a plan that would have the Duke and Duchess of Cambridge permanently move to a larger apartment in Kensington Palace in 2013, after it is renovated. This apartment was previously occupied by the Queen's sister, Princess Margaret, Countess of Snowdon and her husband Antony Armstrong-Jones, Earl of Snowdon after their marriage in 1960. The apartment was retained by Princess Margaret after her divorce in 1978 and was her London residence until her death in 2002. Prince Harry then moved his official residence from Clarence House to the apartment vacated by the Duke and Duchess. In addition, once the move was complete, their official household was also moved to Kensington Palace from St James's Palace, although the household remained shared. Until the moves were complete, their Household remained based at St James's Palace and continued to be shared.

It was later announced in early May 2013 that the royal couple's private secretary, James Lowther-Pinkerton, intended to leave his post as private secretary for the private sector, and his position was split with each member of the household receiving a private secretary. In September 2013, Miguel Head became Private Secretary to the Duke of Cambridge and Rebecca Deacon assumed the role of Private Secretary to the Duchess of Cambridge. Ed Perkins left his post as communication secretary at the household in 2014. On 21 November 2014, the palace announced his replacement as Jason Knauf.

List of Household staff
Private Secretary to the Duke and Duchess of Cambridge and Prince Harry
 2005–2013: Major James Lowther-Pinkerton LVO MBE Irish Guards (Retd.) Lowther-Pinkerton left his post in September 2013, but intended to spend one day a week at St James's Palace to act as a sounding board for the much younger members of staff who will take his place.
Private Secretary to the Duke of Cambridge
 2013–2018: Miguel Head
 2018–2020: Simon Case
 2020–2021: Christian Jones
Private Secretary to the Prince of Wales
 2021–present: Jean-Christophe Gray
Private Secretary to the Duchess of Cambridge
 2013–2017: Rebecca Deacon 
 2017–2019: Catherine Quinn
Private Secretary to the Princess of Wales
 2020–2022: Hannah Cockburn-Logie
 2023–: Alison Corfield
Assistant Private Secretary to the Duke of Cambridge
 2016–: Laura Baker
 2018–: Zoë Ware
Assistant Private Secretary to the Prince of Wales
 2021–: Georgina Riddle
Assistant Private Secretary to the Princess of Wales
 2017–: Natalie Barrows
Advisor to the Duke and Duchess of Cambridge
 2009–2019: Sir David Manning 
Advisor to the Prince and Princess of Wales
 2019–present: Jason Knauf
Communication Secretary to the Duke and Duchess of Cambridge
 –2014: Ed Perkins
 2014–2019: Jason Knauf
 2019–2020: Christian Jones
 2021: Victoria O'Byrne
Communication Secretary to the Prince and Princess of Wales
 2022–present: Lee Thompson
 Deputy Communication Secretary to the Duke and Duchess of Cambridge and Prince Harry
 –2016: Nick Loughran
Digital and Social Lead to the Prince and Princess of Wales
 2020–present: David Watkins
Official Spokesperson for the Duke and Duchess of Cambridge and Prince Harry
 –2013: Paddy Harverson, also Communications Secretary at Clarence House
Equerries
 –2020: Lt Cdr David Brannighan
 2020–present: Lt Cdr Rob Dixon

Household of the Princess Royal
The Household of the Princess Royal provides the administrative support to Anne, Princess Royal, the only sister of the King. While the Princess Royal's private residence is Gatcombe Park; her office, headed by the Private Secretary, is based at Buckingham Palace while her official London residence is located at St James's Palace.

Private Secretaries to the Princess Royal
2019–: Charles Davies
2002–2019: Captain Sir Nick Wright KCVO, RN
1999–2002: Colonel Timothy Earl OBE
1997–1999: Rupert McGuigan
1982–1997: Lieutenant Colonel Sir Peter Gibbs KCVO
1976–1982: Major Nicholas Lawson LVO
1974–1976: Major Benjamin Herman MVO RM

Assistant Private Secretary
2010: Commander Anne Sullivan RN

Office Secretary
?–: Mrs Isabella Ward

Extra Equerry to the Princess Royal
2019–: Captain Sir Nicholas Wright, KCVO

Household of the Duke and Duchess of Edinburgh

The Household of the Duke and Duchess of Edinburgh provides administrative support to the Duke of Edinburgh, youngest brother of the King, and to his wife, the Duchess of Edinburgh. While their private residence is Bagshot Park, their office, headed by the private secretary, is based at Buckingham Palace.

In 1980 of Sqn Ldr Adam Wise was appointed to assist the Prince with his work – although he still shared staff with the Queen and Prince Andrew. In 1983, Wise was promoted to wing commander and appointed Private Secretary to Princes Edward and Andrew, severing his link with The Royal Household. He left in 1987, when Lt Col. Sean O'Dwyer was appointed – also jointly with Prince Andrew.

Private Secretaries to the Duke and Duchess of Edinburgh
 2014–2018: Mr. Tim Roberts
 2002–2014: Brig. John Smedley CVO
 1987–2001: Lt Col. Sean O'Dwyer LVO DL Irish Guards (Retd.)
 1983–1987: Wg Cdr Adam Wise LVO MBE

Private Secretary to the Duke of Edinburgh
 2019–present: Captain Andrew Aspden

Private Secretary to the Duchess of Edinburgh
 2019–present: Mr. Alexander Stonor

Assistant Private Secretary to the Duke and Duchess of Edinburgh
 2015–2018: Mr. Matthew Magee
 2018–2019: Mr. Alexander Stonor
 2021–present: Mr. Jason Keen

Equerry to the Duke and Duchess of Edinburgh
 2008–Present: Major General Alastair Bruce of Crionaich 
 ?–present: Col. Paul Arengo-Jones CVO

Assistant Private Secretaries and Ladies-in-Waiting to the Duchess of Edinburgh
 1999–present: Annabelle Galletley (Mrs. Angus Galletley)
 2000–present: Ms. Suzanne Lofthouse-Jackson
 2009–2020: Amy Mayes (Mrs. Jonathan Mayes)

Programme Co-ordinators to the Duke and Duchess of Edinburgh
 2016–present: Miss. Emily Mortimore
 2017–present: Miss. Jess Utton
 2017–2022: Miss. Kelly Tschumi

Secretarial Assistant to the Duke and Duchess of Edinburgh
 ?–present: Ms. Jackie Phipps

Lesser households

Household of the Duke and Duchess of Gloucester

 Private Secretary to the Duke and Duchess of Gloucester at Kensington Palace: Mr Alistair Wood, LVO MBE 2004–2012
 Lady-in-waiting to the Duchess of Gloucester: Mrs Susan Wigley, CVO

Household of the Duke and Duchess of Kent

Private Secretary to the Duke of Kent, KG at Wren House, Kensington Palace: Mr Nicholas Marden

Household of Princess Alexandra, The Hon Lady Ogilvy

Private Secretary: Mrs Diane Duke
Lady in Waiting: Mrs Peter Afia LVO

Household of Prince and Princess Michael of Kent
Private Secretary to Prince Michael of Kent, GCVO at Kensington Palace: Mr Nicholas Chance, CVO (1997–2016)

Former households

Household of King Edward VII and Queen Alexandra

King Edward VII (1841–1910) was created Prince of Wales shortly after his birth, and his household was known as the Household of the Prince of Wales from 1841. Upon his marriage in 1863, he and his wife shared the Household of the Prince and Princess of Wales until their accession as King and Queen in January 1901, but several appointments were to either the Prince or the Princess (e.g., they each had separate Lords Chamberlain and private Secretaries). When he became King, his household was known as the Household of the Sovereign 1901–1910.

Queen Alexandra (1844–1925) received a separate household upon her husband's accession, the Household of the Queen. From 1910, it was known as the Household of Queen Alexandra.

Household of King George V and Queen Mary

Prince George (1865–1936) was created Duke of York in 1892, and received a separate household together with his brother. Courtiers appointed to assist the Prince George of Wales until that year had been part of his parents' household. After his marriage to Princess Mary of Teck in 1893 they shared the Household of the Duke and Duchess of York.

On the accession of his father, King Edward VII in January 1901, George automatically inherited the dukedom of Cornwall and was known as the Duke of Cornwall and York until the following November, when he was appointed Prince of Wales. From 1901 until his accession in 1910, he and his wife shared the Household of the Prince and Princess of Wales, but several appointments were to either the Prince or the Princess.

When he became King, his household was known as the Household of the Sovereign 1910–1936.

Queen Mary (1867–1953) received a separate household upon her husband's accession, the Household of the Queen. From 1936, it was known as the Household of Queen Mary.

Household of Queen Elizabeth The Queen Mother

This is an incomplete list of those who served Queen Elizabeth The Queen Mother.

Comptroller
1952–1953: Peter Townsend
1953–1974: Lord Adam Gordon
1974–2002: Sir Alastair Aird

Equerries
1950–1956: Capt. Oliver Dawnay
1955–1956: Sir Martin Gilliat
1956–1984: Sir Francis Legh
1959–2002: Sir Ralph Anstruther Bt
1968–1970: Richard Jenkins
1984–2002: Maj. George Seymour
1992–1994: Edward Dawson-Damer
1993–2002: Sir Alastair Aird

Extra Equerries
1953–2002: The Rt Hon. The Lord Sinclair
1955–?: Sir Harvey Kearsley
1956: Maj Raymond Seymour
1956–1962: Capt. Oliver Dawnay
1958–?: Maj. Sir John Griffin
1964–1973: Alastair Aird
1995–2002: Capt. Ashe Windham
1998–2002: Nicholas Assheton

Temporary Equerries
1955: Maj. Raymond Seymour
1956–1958: Maj. John Griffin
1958–1960: Capt. William Richardson
1960–1964: Capt. Alastair Aird
1980–1982: Capt. Ashe Windham
1982–1984: Capt. the Hon. Jeremy Stopford
1984–1986: Capt. Jamie Lowther-Pinkerton
1986–1988 Capt. Niall Hall
1988–1990 Capt. Giles Bassett
?-1994: Capt. Edward Dawson-Damer
1994–?: Maj. Colin Burgess
2000–2002: Capt. Mark Grayson

Ladies-in-Waiting
1923–1926: Lady Katharine Meade
1926–1932: Lady Helen Graham
1932–1936: Lettice Bowlby
1985–2002: Jane Walker-Okeover
1990–2002: Lady Margaret Colville
1991–2002: Margaret Rhodes
1993–2002: Jennifer Gordon-Lennox

Extra Ladies-in-Waiting
1929–?: Lady Annaly

Ladies of the Bedchamber
1937–1941: Viscountess Halifax (extra 1946–?)
1937–1947: Lady Nunburnholme
1937–1972: Countess Spencer DCVO OBE
1937–1994: Viscountess Hambleden GCVO (as Dowager Viscountess from 1948)
1945–1967: Lady Harlech (extra 1941–1945; as Dowager Lady from 1964)
1947–1979: The Countess of Scarbrough as Dowager Countess from 1969
1973–2002: Lady Grimthorpe (daughter of the above Countess of Scarbrough)
1994–2002: The Countess of Scarbrough (daughter-in-law of the above Countess of Scarbrough)

Lord Chamberlain
1937–1965: Col The Earl of Airlie KT GCVO MC
1965–1992: The Earl of Dalhousie KT GCVO GBE MC DL
1992–2002: The Earl of Crawford KT GCVO PC

Mistress of the Robes
1937–1964: Her Grace The Dowager Duchess of Northumberland GCVO
1964–1990: Her Grace The Duchess of Abercorn DCVO
1990–2002: Vacant

Pages of Honour
1962–1964: James Charteris, Lord Neidpath
1964–1966: John Dalrymple-Hamilton
1966–1967: Valentine Cecil
1967–1969: Richard Scott, Lord Eskdaill (later Duke of Buccleuch and Queensberry)
1969–1971: Simon Mulholland Esq.
1971–1973: Michael Bowes-Lyon, Lord Glamis (later Earl of Strathmore and Kinghorne)
1973–1974: Gilbert Clayton Esq.
1974–1975: Colin Campbell-Preston
1975–1977: Charles Bruce, Lord Bruce
1977–1979: Gavin Rankin Esq.
1979–1982: Henry Beaumont
1982–1984: The Hon. Maurice Roche (later Baron Fermoy)
1984–1986: Andrew Hope, Viscount Aithrie (later Earl of Hopetoun)
1987–1989: Andrew Lillingston
1989–1991: Richard Lumley, Viscount Lumley (later Earl of Scarbrough)
1991–1993: John Carew-Pole
1993–1995: Arthur Wellesley, Earl of Mornington
1995–1998: The Hon. Thomas Lumley
1998–1999: Harry Bengough
1999–2002: Andrew Matheson

Press secretary
1956–2001: Sir John Griffin

Private secretaries
1937–1946: Lt Col. Richard Streatfield
1946–1951: Maj. Thomas Harvey
1951–1956: Capt. Oliver Dawnay
1956–1993: Sir Martin Gilliat
1993–2002: Sir Alastair Aird

Assistant private secretaries
1953–1974: Lord Adam Gordon
1955–1956: Martin Gilliat
1956–1959: Francis Legh
1959–1964: Sir Ralph Anstruther Bt
1964–1973: Alastair Aird
1993–2002: Maj. George Seymour

Treasurers
1937–1946: Sir Basil Brooke
1946–1960: Sir Arthur Penn
1961–1998: Sir Ralph Anstruther Bt
1998–2002: Nicholas Assheton

Women of the Bedchamber
1937–1939: Lady Helen Graham
1937–1960: Lady Katharine Seymour
1937–1961: Marion Hyde, Lady Hyde
1937–1944: Lettice Bowlby
1939–?: Lady Adelaide Peel
1944–1947: Lady Mary Herbert
1947–2001: Lady Jean Rankin
1951–1961: The Hon Olivia Mulholland
1960–1993: Lady Ruth Burke Roche, Baroness Fermoy
1961–1963: Lady Mary Harvey
1965–2002: Dame Frances Campbell-Preston DCVO
1981–2002: Lady Angela Oswald CVO

Extra Women of the Bedchamber
1937–1994: Lady Victoria Wemyss (née Cavendish-Bentinck)
1939–?: Lady Helen Graham
1944–1988: Hon. Lettice Bowlby (née Annesley)
1947–?: Lady Mary Herbert
1947: Lady Jean Rankin
1947–?: Alexandra Pelham, Lady Worsley CBE
1948–1951: Pamela Hore-Ruthven (later Cooper), Viscountess Ruthven of Canberra
1956–1960: The Dowager Lady Fermoy
1959–1981: Lady Elizabeth Basset
1960–?: Lady Katherine Seymour

Temporary Women of the Bedchamber
1963–1965: Lady Caroline Douglas-Home

Apothecaries
1954–?: Dr John Nigel Loring

Physicians
1936–?: George Frederick Still
1936–?: Sir John Weir
1936–?: Henry Letheby Tidy
1936–?: Daniel Thomas Davies

Surgeons
1936–?: Sir Lancelot Barrington-Ward
1936–1946: Arthur Porritt

Surgeon-Apothecary
1956–?: Richard May Esq.

Honorific positions
 Piper to the Queen Mother (1953–2002)

Household of Queen Elizabeth II

Household of the Duke of Edinburgh
The Household of the Duke of Edinburgh provided administrative support to Prince Philip, Duke of Edinburgh. It was based at Buckingham Palace, and was headed by his Private Secretary—the Treasurer (part-time 1970–1976) was formerly the senior officer. An equerry (a major or equivalent from any of the three armed services), and three temporary equerries (usually a captain from the Royal Marines, a captain from the Grenadier Guards, and a captain from the Royal Electrical and Mechanical Engineers) were part of the household.

Treasurers 
1952–1959: Lt Gen. Sir Frederick Browning GCVO KBE CB DSO
Acting, 1957–1960: Capt. David Alexander RM
1959–1970: RAdm Sir Christopher Bonham-Carter CB GCVO
1970–1982: Lord Rupert Nevill CVO JP DL KStJ
Acting, 1982–1984: Sir Richard Davies KCVO CBE
1984–1995: Sir Brian McGrath GCVO

Private Secretaries 
1947–1957: Lt Cdr Michael Parker CVO AM RAN
1957–1970: James Orr CVO
May–November 1970: RAdm Sir Christopher Bonham-Carter GCVO CB
1970–1976: Cdr William Willett OBE MVO DSC RN
1976–1982: Lord Rupert Nevill CVO DL
Acting 1982–1984: Sir Richard Davies KCVO CBE
1984–1992: Sir Brian McGrath GCVO
1993–2010: Brig Sir Miles Hunt-Davis GCVO CBE
2010–2021: Brigadier Archie Miller-Bakewell

Household of the Prince of Wales and the Duchess of Cornwall
The Household of the Prince of Wales and the Duchess of Cornwall was the organised office and support system for Charles, Prince of Wales, and his consort Camilla, Duchess of Cornwall. At the time of their 2009 annual review the Office of the Prince of Wales had the full-time equivalent of 121 staff. The head of the Household was the Principal Private Secretary, Clive Alderton. Senior officials included the Deputy Private Secretary, a senior diplomat seconded from the Foreign & Commonwealth Office to advise The Prince on Foreign and Commonwealth affairs, Scott Furssedonn-Wood; Master of the Household, Earl of Rosslyn; the Treasurer, Andrew Wright; Communications Secretary, Julian Payne; and the Equerry, Commander Iain Kearsley RN.

In 2000, the Prince revived a tradition of having an official harpist, a role last seen under Queen Victoria. The first holder of the office was Catrin Finch, followed in 2004 by Jemima Phillips, and in 2007 by Claire Jones.

The Prince of Wales' Office was principally based at Clarence House, London, but also occupied rooms in the rest of St James's Palace. There were also offices for official staff at Highgrove House and Birkhall House, the Prince's private residences.

Most of the expenses incurred in operating the office came from the Prince's private appanage, the Duchy of Cornwall. The only significant costs met by grant-in-aid provided by the Government was for the upkeep of Clarence House, and for official travel by air and rail, and for communications support.

Details of the Prince's Senior Staff were available in his office's annual reports. The following titles all have "to/of The Prince of Wales and The Duchess of Cornwall" suffixed when written in full. Prior to the Prince's 2005 marriage, they were instead suffixed "to/of The Prince of Wales".

Principal Private Secretaries
2005–12 September 2011: Sir Michael Peat KCVO
12 September 2011 – 2015: William Nye LVO
2015–2022 Sir Clive Alderton KCVO

Private Secretaries
2009–2012: Clive Alderton, Private Secretary for Foreign and Commonwealth Affairs
2005–2011: Manon Williams MVO, Private Secretary for Wales (part-time)
2009–: Mark Leishman, LVO (as "Senior Deputy Private Secretary" January – July 2009)
2001–2008: Elizabeth Buchanan CVO
2002–2005: Sir Michael Peat KCVO
1996–2002: Sir Stephen Lamport KCVO
1991–1996: Cdr Richard Aylard CVO RN
1990–1991: Maj. Gen. Sir Christopher Airy KCVO CBE
September 1985 – 1990: Sir John Riddell Bt CVO FRSA
Acting 1 April–September 1985 David Roycroft
1979–1985: Edward Adeane CVO
1970–1978: Sqn Ldr Sir David Checketts KCVO

Masters of the Household
2014–: Cdr The Earl of Rosslyn, CVO, QPM
2008–2014: Wing Cdr Richard Pattle
2006–2008: Lt Col. Sir Malcolm Ross
2005–2006: Kevin Knott

Deputy Masters of the Household
2006–2009: Andrew Farquharson

Treasurers
2012–: Andrew Wright
2005–2012: Leslie Ferrar
–2005: Kevin Knott

Deputy Private Secretaries
2017–: Scott Furssedonn-Wood
2014–2017: Jamie Bowden CMG OBE MVO
2012–2014: Simon Martin
2008–2013: Benet Northcote
2006–2008: Clive Alderton
2005–2008: Mark Leishman
2005–?: Mrs Manon Williams
2005: James Kidner MVO
2002–2005: Elizabeth Buchanan LVO
1998–2002: Mark Bolland
1993–1996: Stephen Lamport
1990–1993: Sir Peter Westmacott KCMG LVO
1988–1990: David Wright LVO
1986–1988: Col. Humphrey Mews

Assistant Private Secretaries
2020-2022: Claire Saunders
?–*: Emily Cherrington
?–2011: Sarah Kennedy-Good
2008: Shilpa Sinha
2008–: Sophie Densham
2006–2008: Anita Kumar
2006–: Jonathan Hellewell
2005–2007: Katy Golding
2005–: Joy Camm & Amanda MacManus (each part-time)
2004–2005: Mrs Manon Williams
2003–2005: Mark Leishman
2003–2005: James Kidner
2002–2005: Paul Kefford
2000–2003: Nigel Baker
1994–1998: Mrs Manon Williams

Equerries
2020–: Lieutenant Colonel Jonathan Thompson, Royal Regiment of Scotland
2018–2020: Cdr. Iain Kearsley, Royal Navy
2015–2018: Maj. Harry Pilcher, Queen's Dragoon Guards
2013–2015: Maj. David Bevan, Welsh Guards
2011–2013: Maj. Peter Flynn, Parachute Regiment
2008–2011: Maj. Will Mackinlay The Royal Scots Dragoon Guards
2006–2008: Sqn Ldr Jayne Casebury, RAF
2004–2006: Wing Cdr Richard Pattle, RAF
2003–2004: Maj. Rupert Lendrum (Senior Equerry)
2002–2004: Lt Cdr Alastair Graham
1999–2002: Lt Cdr William Entwisle
1996–1999: Lt Cdr John Lavery
1994–1996: Maj. Patrick Tabor
1991–1994: Lt Cdr Robert Fraser
1989–1991: Cdr Alastair Watson
1987–1989: Maj. Christopher Lavender
1986–1987: Lt Col. Brian Anderson
1984–1986: Maj. Jack Stenhouse
1982–1984: Maj. David Bromhead
–1982: Maj. Quentin Winter, PARA 
c.1979: Capt. Anthony Asquith, RRW
1977–: Capt. Christopher Haslett Elliott, RRW
1976–1978 Capt. T P G N Ward Welsh Guards
c.1976–1977: Capt. Alun James Davies, RRW
1972–: Lt Gilbert Kerruish, RRW
1970–1972: Lt the Hon. Nicholas Soames, 11th Hussars
c.1971: Lt David Wilson

Assistant Masters of the Household
2007–: The Honourable Virginia Carington, LVO
as "Special Assistant" until 2007
as "Assistant Master of the Household" since 2007

Communications Secretary
2022: Tobyn Andreae
2021–2022: Simon Enright
2016–2021: Julian Payne

Deputy Communications Secretary
Eva Omaghomi

Household of the Duke and Duchess of Sussex
In 2013, it was announced that Prince Harry had appointed former Household Cavalry captain, Edward Lane Fox, as his private secretary effective July 2013.

In March 2019, it was announced that the Duke and Duchess of Sussex would establish a new household for themselves, following the birth of their child in spring as well as the move of their official residence to Frogmore Cottage, with their office set to be located at Buckingham Palace. Following the decision to step back from royal duties, it was announced in February 2020 that they would close their office at Buckingham Palace.

List of Household staff
Private Secretary to the Duke of Sussex
 2013–2018: Edward Lane Fox
Private Secretary to the Duke and Duchess of Sussex
 2018–2019: Samantha Cohen
 2019–2020: Fiona Mcilwham
Deputy Private Secretary to the Duke and Duchess of Sussex
 2019–2020: Heather Wong
Assistant Private Secretary to the Duke of Sussex
 2019–2020: Rob Reader
Assistant Private Secretary to the Duchess of Sussex
 2018–2019: Amy Pickerill
Personal Assistant to the Duchess of Sussex
 2018: Melissa Touabti
Communication Secretary to the Duke and Duchess of Sussex
 2019–2020: Sara Latham
Assistant Communication Secretary to the Duke and Duchess of Sussex
 2018: Katrina McKeever
 Marnie Gaffney
Projects Manager to the Duke and Duchess of Sussex
 2018–2020: Clara Madden
Digital Communications Lead to the Duke and Duchess of Sussex
 2019–2020: David Watkins

Household of the Duke of York

The Household of the Duke of York provided administrative support for the royal duties of Prince Andrew, Duke of York, along with his immediate family. From 1971, Prince Andrew (then aged 11 years), had the assistance of one of the Queen's equerries when required. The first was Sqn Ldr Peter Beer, who served until he was replaced by Maj. George Broke Royal Artillery in 1974, and Lt Cdr Robert Guy RN in 1977.

It was only with the appointment in 1980 of Sqn Ldr Adam Wise, that the Prince could be said to have acquired the assistance of his own staff – although he was still shared with the Queen and Prince Edward. In 1983, Wise was promoted to wing commander and appointed Private Secretary to Princes Andrew and Edward, severing his link with The Royal Household. He left the Duke of York's service in 1987, when Lt Col. Sean O'Dwyer was appointed – also jointly with Prince Edward.

The Duke of York was assisted by a private secretary, deputy private secretary, assistant private secretary and equerry. There were an office assistant, and a handful of personal staff including cook and butler. The Duke of York's office was based at Buckingham Palace, and the Duke has a residence at the Royal Lodge, Windsor, into which he moved during 2004, from Sunninghill Park, Ascot.

In December 2022, it was reported that as a non-working member of the royal family he would no longer have an office at Buckingham Palace.

Private Secretaries to the Duke of York
2012–2020: Mrs Amanda Thirsk
2003–2012: Maj. Alastair Watson LVO
2001–2003: Cdr Charlotte Manley LVO OBE RN
1990–2001: Capt. Neil Blair CVO RN
1987–1990: Lt Col. Sean O'Dwyer MVO DL Irish Guards (Retd.)
1983–1987: Wg Cdr Adam Wise LVO MBE

Assistant Private Secretaries to the Duke of York
 ?–present: James Upsher

Equerry to the Duke of York
2019–: Lieutenant Commander Alex Davies, RN
2017–2019: Captain Edward Monckton
2014–2017: Lieutenant Jack Cooper RN
2012–2014: Lieutenant Commander Michael Hutchinson RN
2010–2012: Flight Lieutenant Charlotte Fenn RAF
2008–2010: Captain Duncan Bailey ACG(SPS)
2006–2008: Captain James Todd RM
2004–2006: Lieutenant Caroline Clark RN

See also
 Finances of the British royal family
 Funeral directors to the Royal Household
 Monarchy of Canada § Federal residences and royal household
 Royal Household Long and Faithful Service Medal

Citations

References

External links
 The Royal Household of HM The King, Official website of the British monarchy
 Prince of Wales Official Website

Royal households
Public bodies and task forces of the United Kingdom government
Positions within the British Royal Household
British royal family